Elections to Alnwick District Council were held for the final time on 3 May 2007.  The whole council was up for election and the council stayed under no overall control. The council was abolished in 2009 when Northumberland County Council became a unitary authority.

Election result

Ward results

External links
BBC report of 2007 Alnwick election result
Alnwick District Council results

2007 English local elections
2007
21st century in Northumberland